Two vessels of the Royal Navy have borne the name HMS Taku after the Taku forts in China.

  was a captured destroyer. She was one of four captured from the Chinese during the Boxer Rebellion in 1900. The four ships were shared between the navies of the UK, France, Imperial Germany and Imperial Russia and until the Russian one was renamed Lieutenant Burakov each was named Taku (see French Takou, German Taku, Russian Taku). She displaced 305 tons, was 194 feet long and her  produced 32 knots courtesy of her Schichau boilers. The British Taku was sold in Hong Kong in 1916.
  was a T-class submarine built by Cammell Laird and launched in 1939.  She served in Second World War and was sold in 1946.

Royal Navy ship names